These are regular season standings and playoff results for The Basketball League.  The league was formed in 2017 as the North American Premier Basketball League (NAPB). In 2018, it was renamed TBL.

2018

Playoffs
There were eight teams in the league with the top four teams seeded one to four for the playoffs. Each round of the playoffs were played a best-of-three series.

2019

The 2019 TBL season is the second season of The Basketball League (TBL) after one season as North American Premier Basketball (NAPB).

Standings
Final standings:

Playoffs
There were ten teams in the league with the top four teams qualifying for the playoffs. The second place Kansas City Tornadoes elected not to participate in the playoffs. The semifinals were split in a generalized East and West series despite not having divisions during the regular season. Each round of the playoffs were played as a best-of-three series.

2020
Prior to the third season, the league added the Columbus Condors, Dayton Flight, Dallas Skyline, Gulf Coast Lions, Indy Express, Lewisville Yellow Jackets, and the Tri-State Admirals as expansion teams. The San Diego Waves were replaced by expansion San Diego Armada while the Waves were being relocated, but neither team would make the 2020 schedule. Due to the lack of other western teams, the Yakima SunKings and the Mesquite Desert Dogs suspended operations. The third season started in January 2020, but on March 11, 2020, the league announced the season would end prematurely due to the COVID-19 pandemic and have a four-team playoff on March 18 through 22. However, the tournament was also cancelled as most events throughout the country were closed to prevent the spread of the virus.

Standings
Final standings:

2021

The 2021 TBL season is the fourth season of The Basketball League (TBL) after one season as North American Premier Basketball (NAPB).

References

The Basketball League seasons